The 1918 South Carolina Gamecocks football team represented the University of South Carolina during the 1918 Southern Intercollegiate Athletic Association football season. Led by Frank Dobson in his first and only season as head coach, the Gamecocks compiled an overall record of 2–1–1 with an identical mark in SIAA play.

Schedule

References

South Carolina
South Carolina Gamecocks football seasons
South Carolina Gamecocks football